Yutengping (Chinese: 魚藤坪) may refer to:

Yutengping Bridge, also known as Longteng Bridge, a destroyed railroad bridge
Yutengping railway station, a defunct railway station near Longteng Bridge